Flavio David Caicedo Gracia (born 29 February 1988) is an Ecuadorian international footballer who plays for River Ecuador, as a midfielder.

Career
Caicedo has played for El Nacional since 2007.

He made his international debut for Ecuador in 2011.

References

External links
 

1988 births
Living people
Association football midfielders
Ecuadorian footballers
Ecuador international footballers
Ecuadorian Serie A players
Manta F.C. footballers
C.D. El Nacional footballers
Barcelona S.C. footballers
Delfín S.C. footballers
Guayaquil City F.C. footballers